E.J. Block Athletic Field is a stadium in East Chicago, Indiana that opened in 1942. It is primarily used for amateur and professional baseball, and is the home field of the Calumet College of St. Joseph's Crimson Wave Baseball team which play in the CCAC. It is also the home park of the East Chicago Central High School baseball team and the East Chicago Post 369 American Legion summer baseball team.

History 
Block Stadium was dedicated on Memorial Day 1942 and financed by the Block family (owners of the Inland Steel Company) to boost employee morale. They later donated the stadium to the City of East Chicago.

The stadium first served a professional team in 1995 when the independent league East Chicago Conquistadors called it home, for their first and only season. The team's average per game attendance was 94 fans per game.

References

External links
E.J. Block Athletic Field on Ball Park Reviews
Virtual Tour at digitalballparks.com
EC Central Baseball

Sports venues in Indiana
Minor league baseball venues
East Chicago, Indiana